Thomas Warren Long (January 10, 1839 – October 25, 1917) was an African Methodist Episcopal minister and politician in Florida. He fought against the Confederacy during the American Civil War and later served in the state legislature. 

Born into slavery on a plantation in Jacksonville, Florida, in 1832, Long eventually escaped and fought with the Union Army during the American Civil War. Thomas Wentworth Higginson was one of his commanding officers.

Long served as Madison County's superintendent of public schools in 1868 and 1869. He represented the Marion County, Florida in the Florida Senate from 1873 until 1879. He helped organize churches for former slaves in Florida. He proposed a legislation for free public schools in Florida.

Florida's state archives have a halftone reproduction, presumably from a newspaper, of a photograph of him.

See also
 African-American officeholders during and following the Reconstruction era

References

1839 births
1917 deaths
Florida state senators